The 1934 Western Reserve Red Cats football team represented Western Reserve University, now known as Case Western Reserve University, during the 1934 college football season. The team was led by Sam Willaman, in his first and only hear as head coach. His staff included assistant coach Bill Edwards.

Schedule

References

Western Reserve
Case Western Reserve Spartans football seasons
Western Reserve Red Cats football